R. D. Robb (born March 31, 1972) is an American actor who appeared as Schwartz in the 1983 film A Christmas Story. He was nominated for an Edda Award in 2005. In 2001 he co-wrote and directed the film Don's Plum.

Acting
Robb has over 20 acting credits, the last of which were voice acting work for the Jade Empire video game. Other credits include roles in Matilda and The Brady Bunch Movie. In 2017, he played a headshot photographer in an episode of The Goldbergs, an episode which referred to his success as a child actor in A Christmas Story and his mother's job as an acting manager as central to the plot. On February 15, 2022, it was announced that Robb would be reprising his role as Schwartz in the A Christmas Story sequel A Christmas Story Christmas for Warner Bros. Pictures and HBO Max.

Don's Plum
In 1995, Robb directed a film called Don's Plum that starred then up-and-coming actors Leonardo DiCaprio and Tobey Maguire. Supposedly DiCaprio and Maguire agreed to star in the film if the film was never released in the United States; Robb disputed this claim. When Robb met with distributors, DiCaprio and Maguire sued. The two sides settled out of court, agreeing to never show the film in the United States or Canada.

Filmography

Film

Television

References

External links

1972 births
Living people
American film directors
American male child actors
American male film actors
Male actors from Philadelphia
20th-century American male actors